Psilocybe subhoogshagenii is a species of psilocybin mushroom in the family Hymenogastraceae. Described as new to science in 2004, it is found in Colombia, where it grows on bare clay soil in tropical forest.

See also
List of psilocybin mushrooms
List of Psilocybe species
Psilocybe hoogshagenii

References

External links

subhoogshagenii
Entheogens
Psychoactive fungi
Psychedelic tryptamine carriers
Fungi of Colombia
Fungi described in 2004
Taxa named by Gastón Guzmán